Uriah Asante (6 March 1992 – 13 June 2016) was a Ghanaian footballer who played as a midfielder.

References

External links
 

1992 births
2016 deaths
Ghanaian footballers
Ghana international footballers
Footballers from Accra
FC Astra Giurgiu players
Étoile Sportive du Sahel players
EGS Gafsa players
Accra Hearts of Oak S.C. players
Ghanaian expatriate footballers
Expatriate footballers in Tunisia
Ghanaian expatriate sportspeople in Tunisia
African Games gold medalists for Ghana
African Games medalists in football
Association football midfielders
Competitors at the 2011 All-Africa Games